Long Beach Airport  is a public airport three miles northeast of downtown Long Beach, in Los Angeles County, California, United States. It is also called Daugherty Field, named after local aviator Earl Daugherty. The airport was an operating base for JetBlue, but this ended on October 6, 2020, as the carrier moved its operating base to LAX, amidst the then-ongoing COVID-19 pandemic. Consequently, Southwest Airlines became the airport's largest airline.

The National Plan of Integrated Airport Systems for 2011–2015 categorized it as a primary commercial service airport. Federal Aviation Administration records say the airport had 1,413,251 passenger boardings in calendar year 2008, 1,401,903 in 2009 and 1,451,404 in 2010.

Overview

Located near the border between Los Angeles County and Orange County, Long Beach Airport serves the Los Angeles MSA. Due to its close proximity to the busier and larger LAX 20 miles away, the airport sees more domestic commercial passenger, cargo, military, and general aviation activity. The airport's placement near many residential areas has led to it having one of the country's strictest ordinances limiting airport noise.

It is the 10th busiest airport in California based on passenger boardings, at 1.4 million. As of May 2018, JetBlue operated the most airline flights out of Long Beach; the other airlines are American, Delta, Hawaiian, and Southwest. Air cargo carriers, including FedEx and UPS, also use LGB. 57,000 tons of goods are carried each year.

The Boeing Company (formerly McDonnell Douglas) maintains maintenance facilities for Boeing and McDonnell Douglas/Douglas aircraft (including the historic DC-9 and DC-10 aircraft) near the Long Beach Airport, and produced the C-17 through 2015. The manufacture facilities were leased to Mercedes-Benz and Relativity Space. Virgin Galactic established the satellite launch vehicles at the Long Beach Airport and operates by Virgin Orbit. Gulfstream Aerospace operates a completion/service center.

Airline flights are restricted, but there are many charters, private aviation, flight schools, law enforcement flights, helicopters, advertising blimps, planes towing advertising banners, etc. Long Beach airport is one of the busiest general aviation airports in the world, with 398,433 aircraft movements in 2007.

The Long Beach Airport has an aggressive noise abatement program, with three full-time noise specialists. Under Long Beach municipal law, the city can criminally prosecute the aircraft's owner and the pilots for breaking the noise ordinance. As the airport continues to grow and air traffic increases, so do the complaints about loud and low flying aircraft. The airport produces a monthly noise and complaint report.

Long Beach Airport has one terminal in Streamline Moderne style that is a historical landmark and was renovated in early 2013.

History
The first transcontinental flight, a biplane flown by Calbraith Perry Rodgers, landed in 1911 on Long Beach's sandy beach. From 1911 until the airport was created, planes used the beach as a runway.

Barnstormer Earl S. Daugherty had leased the area that later became the airport for air shows, stunt flying, wing walking and passenger rides. Later, he started the world's first flight school in 1919 at the same location. In 1923 Daugherty convinced the city council to use the site to create the first municipal airport.

Douglas "Wrong Way" Corrigan used to fly regularly out of Daugherty Field. Before his infamous flight from Brooklyn, New York, to Ireland in 1938, he had flown from Long Beach to New York. After authorities refused his request to continue on to Ireland, he was supposed to return to Daugherty Field, but a claimed navigational error routed him to Ireland. He never publicly acknowledged having flown there intentionally.

The main terminal building was designed by architects William Horace Austin and Kenneth Smith Wing, and was constructed in 1941.

The murals and mosaics were created by artist Grace Clements and completed in 1941, with the support of the Works Progress Administration. They depict aviation, navigation, and constellations.

In the 1940s and 1950s the only airline nonstops from Long Beach Airport were to Los Angeles, San Diego, and sometimes Catalina Island; in 1962 Western Airlines introduced a daily Electra to San Francisco and one a day to San Diego. Jet schedules began in 1968; in 1969 Western Boeing 737-200s flew to Las Vegas, Oakland, and San Francisco.  In 1980 the only jets were Pacific Southwest Airlines (PSA) flights to SFO.

In 1981 a new airline based in Long Beach, Jet America, began nonstop MD-80s to Chicago and, in 1982, to Dallas-Fort Worth. That year Alaska Airlines began nonstop Boeing 727s to Portland and Seattle. In 1983 American Airlines introduced nonstops to Chicago O'Hare and Dallas-Fort Worth, and United Airlines began nonstops to Denver; Continental Airlines started nonstops to Denver as well. In 1984 United scheduled two Boeing 767-200s a day nonstop to Denver, the largest passenger airliners ever to serve LGB.

Between 1990 and 1992 Continental, Delta, TWA, and USAir ended service to LGB, and American Airlines left in early 2006. Alaska Airlines later ended mainline service, and ended codeshare service in 2015. Delta Connection and American Eagle regional jet flights continue at LGB. In February 2016 Southwest Airlines announced plans to begin service to the airport with an initial four available slots. On July 9, 2020, JetBlue announced that they would end service to the airport in October 2020, instead expanding their operations at nearby Los Angeles International Airport.

Military use

To attract the United States Navy, the City of Long Beach built a hangar and an administrative building and then offered to lease it to the Navy for $1 a year for the establishment of a Naval Reserve air base. On May 10, 1928, the U.S. Navy commissioned the field as a Naval Reserve air base (NRAB Long Beach). Two years later the city built a hangar and administrative building for the United States Army Air Corps as well. Significant developments to the little city airport began only after the city built hangars and administrative facilities for the Army and Navy in 1928–30.

As a Naval Reserve Air Base the mission was to instruct, train and drill Naval Reserve personnel. A ground school was offered three nights a week at the base and two nights a week at the University of California in Los Angeles until 1930, when ground school was continuously offered at the base. On April 9, 1939, training in night flight began, and shortly thereafter its facilities began to be used by fleet aircraft as well.

With increased activity by airlines and the private airplane industry, particularly with Douglas Aircraft showing an interest in the Long Beach Municipal Airport, the facility needed more space. With Douglas Aircraft as a resident, the attitude of Long Beach's authorities became openly hostile to naval aviation, with its city manager saying that "the sooner the Navy gets out of the Long Beach airport, the better we will like it."

The Navy began a survey for another site, unknown to city officials at the time. Admiral Ernest J. King, then the Chief of the Bureau of Aeronautics, and Admirals William D. Leahy, Joseph K. Taussig, and Allen E. Smith pointedly requested that the city of Long Beach repair the runways and reminded the city that the Pacific Fleet, then lying offshore in Long Beach and San Pedro harbors, had a payroll of more than $1 million a month. Eventually the city complied with the Navy's requests.

The city remained hostile toward approving a lease on any additional land that the Naval Reserve now required.

The Navy, fed up with the city of Long Beach, decided upon the purchase of some property owned by a Mrs. Susanna Bixby Bryant, a fact made known by the commander of the base, Commander Thomas A. Gray, to the Chief of the Bureau of Aeronautics, Admiral John H. Towers. The circumstances behind the purchase were revealed to James V. Forrestal, Under Secretary of the Navy, and by him to the House Naval Affairs committee who approved the purchase. Although Comdr. Gray had offered Mrs. Bryant $350 an acre, in the best patriotic spirit she sold the property at $300 an acre.

With the site acquired, in 1941, construction funds soon followed and NAS Los Alamitos began to take shape. Upon the transfer of the Naval Reserve Training Facility to Los Alamitos, to the surprise of city officials of Long Beach, in 1942, instead of returning the Naval Reserve Air Base facilities at Long Beach to the city, the Navy turned over the facilities to the United States Army Air Forces, which had established a training base next to it. NARB Long Beach was not totally abandoned but became a Naval Auxiliary Air Station (NAAS).

Through World War II the airfield was given over to the war effort. Once Los Alamitos became an operational base in 1941, NAAS Long Beach now turned to servicing carrier borne F4Fs, SBDs, FM-2s, F4Us, F6Fs, TBF/TBMs, and SB2Cs. In addition, it had utility aircraft and such patrol planes as the PBY, SNB, GB3, NH, GH, and SNJ.

As the Navy's activities began to be shifted to Los Alamitos, the Long Beach Army Airfield at Long Beach became the home of the Army's Air Transport Command's Ferrying Division, with the 1736th Ferrying Squadron assigned, which included a squadron of 18 women pilots commanded by Barbara London, a long time Long Beach aviator.

Like the Naval Air Ferry Command at NAS Terminal Island, the Army's ferrying work was an immense undertaking, thanks to Douglas Aircraft's wartime production. Ground was broken for the initial Douglas Aircraft facility in November 1940, with dedication in October 1941. Douglas had been drawn to Long Beach's growing municipal airport with its Army and Navy facilities. With wartime contracts the company went into intensive production. The company's first C-47 was delivered 16 days after the attack of Pearl Harbor and another 4,238 were produced during the war. The plant turned out some 1,000 A-20 Havocs, not to mention 3,000 B-17 Flying Fortresses and 1,156 A-26 Invaders.

With the end of the war the U.S. Navy abandoned any use of Long Beach Municipal Airport and with it the designation of Long Beach as a Naval Auxiliary Air Station.

Facilities

Long Beach Airport covers 1,166 acres (472 ha) at an elevation of 60 feet (18 m). It has three asphalt runways:
 12/30 is 10,000 by 200 feet (3,048 x 61 m)
 8L/26R is 6,192 by 150 feet (1,887 x 46 m)
 8R/26L is 3,918 by 100 feet (1,194 x 30 m)

It has six helipads:
 H1 is 20 by 20 feet (6 x 6 m)
 H2 is 20 by 20 feet (6 x 6 m)
 H3 is 300 by 35 feet (91 x 11 m)
 H4 is 20 by 20 feet (6 x 6 m)
 H5 is 20 by 20 feet (6 x 6 m)
 H6 is 20 by 20 feet (6 x 6 m)

Runways 16L/34R and 16R/34L were permanently closed on July 21, 2016. Runway 16L/34R was 3,330 by 75 feet (1,015 x 23 m), and runway 16R/34L was 4,470 by 75 feet (1,362 x 23 m). Both runways were removed.

In the year ending September 30, 2019, the airport had 293,587 aircraft operations, average 804 per day: 86% general aviation, 11% airline, 3% air taxi, and <1% military. 369 aircraft were then based at the airport: 224 single-engine, 46 multi-engine, 41 jet, and 58 helicopter.

Airlines and destinations

Passenger

Cargo

Destinations map

Statistics

Top destinations

Airline market share

Annual traffic

Ground transportation
Long Beach Transit routes 102, 104, 111, and 176 serve the airport. Specifically, route 111 southbound from the airport connects at the Downtown Long Beach Station, where a passenger can easily transfer to the Blue Line northbound, and destinations in downtown Los Angeles.Route 104 connects to the Willow Street Station.

The San Diego Freeway (I-405) can be reached from the airport via Lakewood Boulevard (SR 19). Wardlow Road runs from the airport to the Los Angeles County/Orange County border, where it becomes Ball Road and crosses the north edge of the Disneyland Resort; Long Beach Airport is the second closest airport to Disneyland, after John Wayne Airport.

Airport improvements program
On December 12, 2012, the Long Beach Airport completed a $136 million improvement project designed to modernize the main terminal without sacrificing its historic Art Deco architecture or reputation among travelers for convenience. It was developed to improve the customer experience by providing resort-like amenities, having a central palm garden, outdoor dining areas with fire pits, wine bars, and 11 gates. A new 2,000-space parking structure was completed ahead of schedule and below budget. $5 million was spent to refurbish the old terminal, which was originally built in 1941 and declared a historic landmark by the city decades later. The new terminal retains the open-air feeling of the current terminal complex, and passengers still walk across the tarmac when boarding or leaving their planes. The baggage claim also is partially enclosed, as it was before.

In February 2020, the Long Beach City Council approved of a new $80-million Phase II improvement project. The project will create a new ticketing building and seismically retrofit the historic terminal building which currently holds the ticketing counter. The project also includes moving the rental car area into the old ticketing area, upgraded baggage claim areas, and a new meet-and-greet area. Design and construction began in 2020 and will continue through 2022.

Accidents and incidents
On March 16, 2011, a privately owned Beechcraft King Air crashed shortly after takeoff, killing five people and injuring another. The NTSB determined the cause of the crash to be a result of poor pilot technique that failed to maintain aircraft control, following a momentary interruption of power to the left engine caused by water contamination of the fuel. The NTSB found the water contamination was allowed to build up in the aircraft's fuel sumps due to poor maintenance and pre-flight practices, and lack of communication between the pilot and aircraft mechanics over who was responsible for draining the sumps before each flight. Because of this, enough water was allowed to build up in the fuel sumps to initiate this accident.

Movies and television
The airport appears in:

 The Parent Trap (1998 film)

See also

 California World War II Army Airfields
 Western Air Defense Force

References

External links
 Long Beach Airport, official website
 Historic California Posts: Long Beach Army Air Field
 Aerial image as of 29 March 2004 from USGS The National Map
 
 

Buildings and structures in Long Beach, California
Transportation in Long Beach, California
Airfields of the United States Army Air Forces Air Transport Command in North America
Airfields of the United States Army Air Forces in California
Streamline Moderne architecture in California
Airports in Los Angeles County, California
Landmarks in Long Beach, California